The Clod is a 1913 American short silent Western film about the Mexican Revolution directed by and starring Romaine Fielding with co-stars Mary Ryan and Minnie Frayne. It was produced by Siegmund Lubin and distributed by the General Film Company.

Cast
 Romaine Fielding – Pedro Mendez, the Clod
 Mary Ryan – Pedro's Wife
 Minnie Frayne – Pedro's Mother

References

External links
 

1913 films
1913 Western (genre) films
American black-and-white films
Films directed by Romaine Fielding
Lubin Manufacturing Company films
Silent American Western (genre) films
1910s American films